The 1906 Mercer Baptists football team represented Mercer University in the 1906 Southern Intercollegiate Athletic Association football season. Led by E. E. Tarr  in his first and only season as head coach, Mercer compiled san overall record of 1–4 with a mark of 0–2 in SIAA play.

Schedule

References

Mercer
Mercer Bears football seasons
Mercer Baptists football